Boško Radović (Serbian Cyrillic: Бошко Радовић; born 26 May 1979) is a Montenegrin professional basketball coach who is currently the head coach for Montenegrin national basketball team, since December 2019 and resignation of Zvezdan Mitrović from the post, prior promotion to head coach he was assistant coach for national team, during the tenure of Mitrović and Bogdan Tanjević, between 2015 and December 2019.

He was also a longtime junior coach and Coordinator of the Junior selections of Montenegro national team.

References

Living people
1979 births
Sportspeople from Podgorica
Montenegrin basketball coaches